WVHO-LP (94.5 FM, "Hope Radio") is a radio station broadcasting a Christian rock music format. Licensed to Nanticoke, Pennsylvania, United States, the station is currently owned by St. John's Evangelical Lutheran Church.

References

External links
 Hope FM Online
 

VHO-LP
VHO-LP
Luzerne County, Pennsylvania
Radio stations established in 2007
2007 establishments in Pennsylvania